The Lake Superior and Mississippi Railroad is the name for two different railroads in Minnesota.

Historic railroad

The Lake Superior and Mississippi Railroad (LS&M) was the first rail link between the Twin Cities and Duluth and came into existence in 1863 when financier Jay Cooke selected Duluth as the northern end of a new railroad. Lyman Dayton, a local businessman  put up $10,000 of his own money to do the original surveying work and served as the railroad's president until his death in 1865. Dayton was succeeded as president by Frank Hamilton Clark, a Philadelphia banker whose family firm gave Cooke his start in the financial industry.

The LS&M was completed in 1870, running through the city of Carlton and running along the path of the Saint Louis River to Duluth. Later that year the first passenger trains started running between the Twin Cities and Duluth.

The LS&M was a victim of the Panic of 1873, as Jay Cooke's company was overextended and burdened with financial commitments to the Northern Pacific Railway.  The LS&M reorganized in 1877 as the St. Paul and Duluth Railroad. It was later folded into the Northern Pacific Railway. The northern section of the line was moved and carried passenger trains until the 1930s.

Modern railroad

The name of the Lake Superior and Mississippi Railroad (LSMRR) was revived in 1981 when the volunteer Lake Superior Transportation Club incorporated a heritage railroad company to offer a passenger excursion service along the Saint Louis River.

Much of the modern LSMRR route follows the right-of-way that the historic LS&M built in the 19th century. The LSMRR was given the accolade "Best Train Ride" by the St. Paul Pioneer Press (May 18, 2003)

References
 The Lake Superior and Mississippi Railroad
 

Defunct Minnesota railroads
Heritage railroads in Minnesota
Predecessors of the Northern Pacific Railway
Railway companies established in 1861
Tourist attractions in Duluth, Minnesota
Railway companies disestablished in 1877
1861 establishments in Minnesota